Richard Wilfred Weber (April 10, 1919 – November 19, 1991) was an American football player. 

Born in Lawrence, Massachusetts, Weber attended Lawrence High School and played college football for the Saint Louis Bililkens from 1939 to 1941. During World War II, he served in the Army from 1942 to 1945 and played for the Fort Benning football team. After the war, he played professional football in the National Football League (NFL) as a running back for the Detroit Lions. He appeared in three NFL games during the 1945 season.

References

1919 births
1991 deaths
People from Lawrence, Massachusetts
American football running backs
Saint Louis Billikens football players
Detroit Lions players
Players of American football from Massachusetts